Joaquim Nabuco is a Brazilian municipality in the state of Pernambuco, with an estimated population of 16,011 inhabitants as of 2020, according with IBGE. Has a total area of 121,88 km². Joaquim Nabuco was a famous Pernambuco statesman, who lived in the 19th century.

Geography

 State - Pernambuco
 Region - Zona da mata Pernambucana
 Boundaries - Bonito and Cortês  (N); Palmares and Água Preta    (S);  Palmares   (W);  Água Preta and Ribeirão   (E)
 Area - 121.88 km2
 Elevation - 152 m
 Hydrography - Una and Sirinhaém Rivers
 Vegetation - Subperenifólia forest
 Climate - Hot tropical and humid
 Annual average temperature - 24.7 c
 Distance to Recife - 119 km

Economy
The main economic activities in Joaquim Nabuco are based in food and beverage industry and agribusiness, especially plantations of sugarcane, manioc; and creations of cattle.

Economic Indicators

Economy by Sector
2006

Health Indicators

References

Municipalities in Pernambuco

it:Joaquim Nabuco